KMB Route 1A is a bus route operated by Kowloon Motor Bus (KMB) in Hong Kong. It runs between Star Ferry and Sau Mau Ping (Central) and provides air-conditioned service. The route runs via Tsim Sha Tsui, Yau Ma Tei, Mong Kok, Kowloon City, San Po Kong, Ngau Tau Kok, Kwun Tong, and Sau Mau Ping.

This route holds the record for the longest time of running a mix of non-air-conditioned and air-conditioned buses, from 1991 to 2012, this despite it being one of the earliest routes to introduce air-conditioned bus service.

History
 4 June 1968: Route introduced with the terminus at Yue Man Square, replaces first generation Route 2B.
 15 September 1971: Route extended to Sau Mau Ping (Central)..
 10 February 1991: Ten air-conditioned buses introduced to the route.
 7 May, 2012: Converted into a fully air-conditioned bus service.

Bus route information
 This route goes past Yau Ma Tei, Mong Kok, Ho Man Tin, Ma Tau Wai, Kowloon Bay, Ngau Tau Kok and Kwun Tong.
 The districts this route goes past is Yau Tsim Mong District, Kowloon City District, Wong Tai Sin District and Kwun Tong District.
 Nathan Road, Prince Edward Road West, Prince Edward Road East, Boundary Street (Eastbound only) and Kwun Tong Road are major roads that this bus route goes past.

Sau Mau Ping (Central) to Star Ferry
 Sau Mau Ping (Central)
 Sau On House
 Sau Ming House
 Leung Shek Chee College
 Hiu Lai Court
 Cheung Wo Court
 Wo Lok Estate
 Yue Man Square
 Millennium City
 Ting Fu Street, Kwun Tong
 Lower Ngau Tau Kok Estate
 Telford Gardens
 Kowloon Bay Railway Station
 Kai Yip Estate
 Richland Gardens
 Rhythm Garden
 The Latitude
 Regal Oriental Hotel
 Hau Wong Road
 La Salle Road
 Earl Street
 Knight Street
 Diocesan Boys' School
 Heep Wo Primary School
 Prince Edward Railway Station
 Nelson Street, Mong Kok
 Soy Street, Mong Kok
 Wing Sing Lane, Yau Ma Tei
 Cheong Lok Street, Yau Ma Tei
 Tak Shing Street, Tsim Sha Tsui
 Cameron Road
 Middle Road, Tsim Sha Tsui
 Hong Kong Cultural Centre
 Star Ferry

Star Ferry to Sau Mau Ping (Central)
 Star Ferry
 Middle Road, Tsim Sha Tsui
 Kimberley Road
 Bowring Street, Yau Ma Tei
 Kowloon Central Post Office
 Man Ming Lane, Yau Ma Tei
 Changsha Street, Mong Kok
 Nelson Street, Mong Kok
 HK & KLN Chiu Chow School
 Queen Elizabeth School
 Prince Edward Railway Station
 Fa Hui Park
 Caritas Lodge
 Beverly Villas
 St Teresa's Hospital
 Hau Wong Road
 Regal Oriental Hotel
 The Latitude
 Rhythm Garden
 Ping Shek Estate
 Kai Yip Estate
 Kowloon Bay Railway Station
 Lower Ngau Tau Kok Estate
 Kwun Tong Road Sitting-Out Area
 Millennium City
 Kwun Tong Town Centre
 Wo Lok Estate
 Sau Nga Road Playground
 Hiu Lai Court
 Hiu Kwong Street Recreational Ground
 Leung Shek Chee College
 Sau Fu House 
 Sau Mau Ping (Central)

See also
 1a space, an independent art space named after the route

References

001A